Abū Ibrāhīm K͟halīl Aḥmad ibn Majīd ‘Alī Anbahṭawī Sahāranpūrī Muhājir Madanī (December 185213 October 1927) was a Deobandi Hanafi Islamic scholar from India who authored Badhl Al-Majhud Fi Hall Abi Dawud, an 18-volume commentary on the hadith collection Sunan Abi Dawud. He was also a Sufi shaykh of the Chishti order, being a disciple and successor of Rashid Ahmad Gangohi.

Name and family background
In one of his books he introduces himself as, "Ḥāfiz̤ Abū Ibrāhīm K͟halīl Aḥmad ibn Shāh Majīd ‘Alī ibn Shāh Aḥmad ‘Alī ibn Shāh Qut̤b ‘Alī." In the biographical work Nuzhat al-Khawatir it is written, "K͟halīl Aḥmad al-Anbeṭhawī as-Sahāranpūri: The Shaykh, the ‘Ālim, the Faqīh, K͟halīl Aḥmad ibn Majīd ‘Alī ibn Aḥmad ‘Alī ibn Qut̤b ‘Alī ibn G͟hulām Muḥammad al-Anṣārī al-Ḥanafī al-Anbeṭhawī, one of the righteous scholars and senior jurists and traditionists." In Mu‘jam al-Ma‘ājim wa-al-Mashyakhāt it is written, "The Shaykh, the Muḥaddith, the Faqīh, Khalīl Aḥmad ibn Majīd ‘Alī […] al-Anṣārī al-Ḥanafī al-Anbayt′hawī as-Sahāranfūri al-Muhājir al-Madanī, one of the senior scholars of India." Husain Ahmad Madani writes in the introduction to Badhl al-Majhud, "Mawlānā Abū Ibrāhīm Khalīl Aḥmad, al-Ayyūbī al-Anṣārī by lineage and origin, al-Ḥanafī ar-Rashīdī by mashrab (spiritual disposition, lit. 'spring') and madhhab (legal school), and al-Jishtī al-Qādirī an-Naqshbandī as-Suhrawardī by ṭarīqah (Sufi order) and maslak (track)."

His given name was Khalil Ahmad, while Abu Ibrahim was his kunya. He was Ayyubi and Ansari, as his family claimed descent from Abu Ayyub al-Ansari, a companion of the Islamic prophet Muhammad. He was Anbahtawi (of Ambehta, referring to his family home), then Saharanpuri (of Saharanpur), then Madani (of Medina). The nisbat Muhajir Madani indicates his permanent migration (hijrah) to the holy city. He followed the Hanafi school of fiqh (Islamic jurisprudence), and in tasawwuf (Sufism) he was a disciple of Rashid Ahmad Gangohi in the Sabiri-Imdadi chain of the Chishti order, which incorporates the Chishtia, Qadiri, Naqshbandi, and Suhrawardi orders.

Biography
Khalil Ahmad was born in late Safar 1269 AH (early December 1852) in Nanauta, Saharanpur district, British India (in present-day Uttar Pradesh, India). He was named both "Zahiruddin" and "Khalil Ahmad", but the second name was what he became known by. The chronogram "Z̤ahīruddīn wa Aḥmad" ("Zahiruddin and Ahmad") equates to the year of his birth, 1269, using Abjad numerals.

His mother Mubarak-un-nisa was the daughter of Mamluk Ali Nanautawi and the sister of Muhammad Yaqub Nanautawi, who would later be sadr mudarris (head teacher) at Darul Uloom Deoband. On his father's side he was Ayyubi Ansari and on his mother's side he was Siddiqi.

Early education
Khalil Ahmad began his education at the age of five in a maktab (elementary school) with study of the qaidah, a common text for learning Arabic script. For barakah (blessing), his grandfather Mamluk Ali conducted the opening bismillah ceremony. In a short time completed nazirah (reading) of the Qur'an and then began studying Urdu. In Ambehta and Nanauta he completed hifz (memorization) of the Qur'an and study of the primary Urdu and Persian books under various teachers.

At the age of eleven, he began his Arabic studies in Gwalior with his paternal uncle Maulana Ansar Ali Saharanpuri, who served as Sadrus Sudur in Gwalior, head of the state's religious department. With Ansar Ali he studied the primary books of Arabic—Mizan as-Sarf, Sarf Mir, and Panj Ganj. After some time Khalil Ahmad's father, who was also employed in Gwalior, resigned from his work and returned to Ambehta with Khalil Ahmad. His education was assigned to Maulana Sakhawat Ali Ambehtawi, with whom he studied up to Kafiyah and its commentary Sharh Jami in Arabic grammar. Thereafter, in compliance with his father's wishes, he enrolled at the government English-medium school and commenced secular studies.

Higher studies
When Darul Uloom Deoband was opened in Muharram 1283 AH (May 1866) and Maulana Yaqub Nanautawi  was appointed as sadr mudarris (the head teacher), Khalil Ahmad took permission from his parents and travelled to Deoband, where he resumed his Islamic studies from Kafiyah. Six months later Mazahir Uloom was established and Mazhar Nanautawi was appointed sadr mudarris. Due to the environment not suiting him at Deoband, he transferred to Mazahir Uloom Saharanpur and entered in the class of Mukhtasar al-Ma'ani.

At Mazahir Uloom he spent several years acquiring knowledge of subjects including fiqh, usul al-fiqh, hadith, and tafsir. Most books were taught by Maulana Mazhar Nanautawi and some by Maulana Ahmad Hasan Kanpuri. Studies in hadith were commenced in 1285 AH (1868) with Mishkat al-Masabih. Sahih al-Bukhari and Hidayah were among the books studied in 1286 AH (1869). In the annual examinations Khalil Ahmad was regularly among the students who received prizes for high marks. He received his sanad-i faraghat (graduate degree) in 1288 AH (1871) at the age of 19. That year he received a copy of Sahih al-Bukhari as a special prize from Maulana Ahmad Ali Saharanpuri.

Following his graduation, he was appointed as an assistant Arabic teacher at Mazahir Uloom. However he soon left for Lahore to pursue further studies in adab (Arabic literature) with Maulana Faizul Hasan Saharanpuri, head of the Arabic department at the Oriental College in Lahore. In a few months Khalil Ahmad studied books of adab from him including Maqamat and Mutanabbi.

Bay'at
One day, Moulana Khalil's paternal uncle, Moulvi Ansar Ali said, "After your studies, you should acquire tasawwuf from Moulvi Saab (i.e. Gangohi)". At around this time, Moulana Khalil's marriage was conducted with a woman from Gangoh. Thus, he passed much of his time in Gangoh. While in Gangoh, Khalil remained in the blessed company of Gangohi. However, the thought of requesting Khalil for bay'at did not occur to him. However, after his graduation, the idea of bay'at did occur to him. Coincidentally, Moulana Muhammad Qasim Nanotvi arrived. At night, in privacy, Moulana Khalil said, "I have the thought of bay'at. In our surroundings, there are several buzurgs. I do not know what is best for me. If you feel that it is best for me to enter into the association of your khuddam, then do accept me. However, instruct me according to what you feel is best for me." In reply, Moulana explained that there was none better than Moulana Rashid Ahmad for this. Moulana Khalil then said, "He is extremely reluctant regarding bay'at. However, if you intercede on my behalf, then this matter will be finalised. He responded, "Good, when I come to Gangoh, be there." Thus, when he was informed that Moulana was travelling to Gangoh, Moulana Khalil immediately did the same. In the morning, after he had conversed with Gangohi, he called for Moulana Khalil. Moulana Khalil entered, greeted Gangohi, and sat down. Gangohi, with a slight smile, said, "Humble and lowly people become my murids. You are the son of a pir and selected one. Why do you wish for your bay'at to be accepted by me?" This statement incapacitated Khalil's senses and he stammered, "Hazrat, I am worse, more contemptible, and useless than them (the humble folk). Gangohi responded, "Enough! Enough! Make Istikhara. I am coming to the masjid". Moulana Khalil immediately proceeded to the masjid, performed wudhu, and performed Istikhara. When Gangohi arrived, he instructed Moulana Khalil to repent and initiated him into the System of Subjection thereafter.

Career
In 1871, Khalil became a teacher at Mazahirul Uloom Saharanpur. His monthly salary was three rupees. However, soon after, he proceeded to Lahore to pursue further studies in Uloomul Adabiyya. He remained in Lahore for a few months. After studying Maqaamaat and Mutanabbi under Moulana Faidhul Hasan, he travelled to Deoband. Moulana Ya'qub arranged for him to be employed as the translator of Qaamus into Urdu. The monthly salary was ten rupees. He was sent to a mountainous terrain to execute this task and returned after approximately two months. Thereafter, he became the principal of Manglore's madrasa. At around this time, an offer of employment from Bhopal arrived for Maulana Ya'qub for a monthly salary of three hundred rupees, but he declined the offer. However, he was pressed to send another reliable person to occupy the post, so he decided to send Khalil. By the choice of his honourable uncle and on the approval of Gangohi, he departed in 1293 AH to occupy the post in Bhopal at a monthly salary of fifty rupees. However, due to his dislike of Bhopal and its atmosphere, Khalil resigned and requested permission to return. In accordance with the instructions of Moulana Gangohi, Khalil remained in Bhopal until the Hajj season. Khalil then departed from Bhopal with a few months of salary in advance.

After returning from his first Hajj, Khalil spent a few days in his hometown. Thereafter, he departed for Sikandrabad in the Bulandshahr district of Uttar Pradesh in Jumadul Awwal of 1294 AH, where he became a teacher at the Madrasa Arabiyya of the Jami’ Masjid. However, the people there vehemently opposed him. Thus, he sought permission from Gangohi to return. However, Gangohi refused. Despite Khalil's affection and affability, the intransigence of the people increased. Thus, later with the permission of Gangohi, Khalil resigned and returned. In 1295 AH, a letter from Moulvi Shamsuddin, Chief Justice of Bhawalpur, was sent to Moulana Muhammad Ya'qub. The letter was a request for a highly qualified teacher. Moulana Ya'qub selected Khalil for this post. Finally, upon the instructions of Moulana Ya'qub and Moulana Gangohi, Khalil accepted the post in Bhawalpur at a monthly salary of thirty rupees.

Thereafter, Khalil returned to Saharanpur and resumed his post as a teacher there. He soon progressed into a senior teacher and taught Tawdih Talwih, Hammaasa Rashidiyya, Sharhul Wiqaayah, Shara Nukhbatul Fikr, Mu'atta Imam Muhammad, and Siraji. The following year, together with several kitabs of various subjects, Khalil taught Sahih al-Bukhari, Sunan Abu Da'ud, Sunan al-Tirmidhi, and Sahih Muslim. Khalil, together with internal spiritual knowledge, also possessed external theoretical knowledge. He could lecture on any kitab with ease and possessed perfect methodology. Even Moulana Anwar Shah Kashmiri would visit Khalil for advice and guidance in his writings and discourses.

Journeys for Hajj
Khalil performed Hajj seven times in his lifetime. He went for Hajj in 1293 AH, while he was in Bhopal. Although he did not possess sufficient money, his enthusiasm compelled him to proceed for Hajj. On reaching Mecca, he presented himself at the home of Haji Imdadullah (who hailed from Nanauta, the native village of Khalil's mother). After completing Hajj, his intention was to proceed to Medina. Thus, Khalil departed for Medina. He remained there for about two weeks, after which he returned home. During this journey, Khalil received ijaazah in hadith from Shaikhul Haram Ahmad Dahlan and Shaikhul Mashaa'ikh Shah Abdul Ghani Mujaddid An Naqshbandi Ad Dehlvi. The ijaazah from Shaikh Ahmad Dahlan was acquired in Mecca, while that of Shah Abdul Ghani was obtained in Medina in 1294 AH.

Khalil's second Hajj occurred when he was in Bhawalpur in Shawwaal of 1297 AH. When he departed for Hajj, Moulana Gangohi wrote to Haji Imdadullah requesting him to confer the mantle of khilaafah onto Khalil. Thus, on seeing Khalil, Haji became overjoyed. In Muharram of 1298 AH, he presented the document of khilaafah adorned with his seal to Khalil. In a state of elation, Haji placed his turban on Khalil's head. Khalil presented both of these gifts to Gangohi and said, "I am not deserving of these. This is only your affection and grace for me." To which Gangohi replied, "May these be blessed for you. He then signed the Khilaafat Nama and handed it with the turban to Khalil. However, the respect of Khalil was such that whenever he would initiate a murid, he would instruct the murid to proclaim, "I have made bay'at to Hazrat Moulana Rashid Ahmad Gangohi at the hands of Khalil Ahmad".

Khalil's third and all subsequent Hajj journeys were undertaken from Saharanpur. The third Hajj was after the demise of Gangohi. Consolation for the immense grief that he suffered as a result of this event could only be obtained from the grave of Prophet Muhammad.

Khalil's fourth Hajj was performed in 1910. He departed from Saharanpur in the middle of Dhul Qa'da and reached Mecca on 8 December 1910. After Hajj, he travelled to Medina via Yambu’. He remained there for twenty-two days and then returned to Saharanpur at the end of Safar in 1329 AH.

Khalil's fifth Hajj was a momentous occasion which occurred in Shawwal of 1332 AH in the company of Shaikhul Hind. In Mecca, on account of the oppression of Sharif Husain, Khalil was compelled to return before Hajj. He departed from Mecca at the end of Shawwal and his ship arrived in Bombay on 6 September 1916. However, as he alighted from the ship, him, his wife, and his brother, Haji Maqbul Ahmad, who was his right-hand man, were arrested. All three of them were transported to Nanital with their luggage. They were released shortly afterwards.

Khalil's sixth Hajj occurred in 1920. He departed from Saharanpur on 21 April 1920 and reached Mecca on 29 May 1920. Despite his weakness and dizziness due to seasickness, Khalil led Tarawih Salaah while standing. He would recite half of a para in eight rakats. When Khalil arrived in Mecca, Moulana Muhibbuddin Muhajir-e-Makki, while embracing him, said, "Moulana, why have you come here? The greater Qiyaamah is about to be enacted here. Return immediately to India after Ramadan". Thus, Khalil said to his companions, "It was my intention to reside in Medina, but Maulana Muhibbuddin Saab vehemently forbids it. I have already visited Medina several times. Since this is your first Hajj and it is unknown if you will receive this opportunity again, proceed to Medina". Khalil came back to Saharanpur in Safar of 1339 AH.

Khalil's seventh Hajj was the journey during which he bid a final farewell to India. On the insistence of his attendants from Hyderabad, it was arranged for Khalil to remain in Hyderabad for a week. Khalil departed from Saharanpur for Hyderabad on 29 April 1926. After his sojourn in Hyderabad, he left for Bombay. He departed from Hyderabad at 9:00 AM on Saturday, 8 May 1926 and arrived in Bombay the following morning. From Bombay, the ship on which he was travelling departed on 19 May 1926. The ship arrived in Kamraan on 29 May 1926, left Kamraan on 30 May 1926, and arrived in Jeddah on 2 June 1926. From Jeddah, the journey to Mecca was by camel. The party reached Mecca on 6 June 1926. Khalil had rented a house on a narrow street opposite Bab alIbrahim, where he remained with three or four of his attendants. On 8 June 1926, they left for Mina. Khalil and his wife rode one camel. In Mina, they remained in the tent of the mutawwif. One tent was for the ladies and another tent was for Khalil and his attendants. After Hajj, they remained in Mecca for a few days. It was then decided to proceed to Medina. The departure was planned for 24 June 1926, but the government confiscated twenty-three camels, which resulted in a delay of two days. They arrived in Medina on Monday, 19 July 1926 at the time of Chasht. Aqdas Moulana Al-Haj Sayyid Ahmad had rented a house in Madrasa Shari'a Qadim. He occupied the ground floor of this house. Khalil occupied the second floor. The third floor was occupied by Moulana Sayyid Ahmad's womenfolk. Adjacent to this was the residence of Khalil's womenfolk.

After Ishraq Salah, Khalil would remain in his room for a few hours in complete solitude, engrossed in writing Badhlul Majhud. After the completion of Badhlul Majhud, this portion of the morning was utilised to study Wafa ul Wafa and other kitabs which had accumulated during Khalil's sojourn in Medina. During Ramadan, Khalil would engage in recitation of the Qur'an after Ishraq Salaah for a considerable time. If it was not Ramadan, he would eat his meal in the same room thereafter. After his meal, Khalil would rest in the zanaana. If it was Ramadan, he would rest in the zanaana right after he completed his morning activity. After a siesta, he would depart for Al-Masjid an-Nabawi before Zawwaal. He would return home after Zuhr. There, he would engage in the recitation of the Qur’an for approximately an hour. Thereafter, he would occupy himself by studying Wafa ul Wafa. After Asr prayer, he would proceed to the home of Moulana Sayyid Ahmad and remain there until Maghrib prayer. Here, Khalil would hold a majlis, which was open to the public. In Ramadan, he would leave for Al-Masjid an-Nabawi shortly before Maghrib Salaah and participate in iftar there with dates and Zam-Zam water. After Maghrib Salaah, Khalil would recite two paras of Qur'an in Awwaabin Salaah on the roof of Madrasatul 'Uloom Shari'a in a sitting position. After Isha Salaah in Al-Masjid an-Nabawi, Khalil would return to the madrasa and perform Tarawih Salaah behind Qari Muhammad Taufiq. Tarawih Salaah would end at approximately 12:30 AM. He would then retire to bed at approximately 1:30 AM and instructed his attendants to awaken him at 3:30 AM.

On his arrival in Medina, Khalil engrossed himself in the completion of Badhlul Majhud which had reached a length of four volumes prior to his arrival in Medina. When he arrived in Medina, he commenced Kitabul Jana'iz. The solitude which Khalil had coupled with the baraka of Medina enabled him to complete one and a half volumes in seven and a half months. The work was written in Moulana Sayyid Ahmad's room. However, for the acquisition of baraka, it was completed at Raudatu min Riyadhil Jannah in Al-Masjid an-Nabawi. On the completion of Badhlul Majhud, Khalil was overwhelmed with happiness, so he invited the 'Ulama of Medina for a lavish feast.

Final years and death
Towards the end Ramadaan, Khalil became affected with paralysis and moved about with difficulty. The paralysis had started after the completion of Badhlul Majhud, when he became ill. However, this illness disappeared with the dawn of Ramadaan. However, the illness reappeared two or three days before Eid ul-Fitr and then paralysis set in. At the end of Ramadaan, he experienced the effects of partial paralysis. Even on Eid al-Fitr, the effect of the paralysis was predominant to such an extent that he was unable to attend Salat al-Eid in the Haram. However, when he regained his strength, he limped to Al-Masjid an- Nabawi with a cane. In the month of Rabiul Akhir in 1346 AH, the severity of his illness intensified. His fever and paralysis increased. Sometimes, when the severity of his illness increased, he could not attend salah at the Al-Masjid an-Nabawi. However, when he felt somewhat better, he would go to Al-Masjid an-Nabawi with the support of a cane and the aid of one of his attendants. In the first week of Rabi ul Aakhir in 1346 AH, he experienced pain in his chest, which would disappear when he was massaged. In the second week, on the request of some of the 'Ulama of Medina, Khalil started to teach Sunan Abu Da'ud after Asr Salaah at the residence of Maulana Sayyid Ahmad. After conducting lessons for a weekend, while returning from Zuhr Salaah on Monday, Khalil complained of more pain in his chest. He added that he had felt a similar pain three or four days earlier, which disappeared within two or three hours after a massage. On reaching the house, he was massaged. At the time of Asr Salaah, although the pain had decreased, weakness did not permit him to attend salah in the Haram. Thus, he performed Asr Salaah at home behind Moulvi Sayyid Ahmad. Despite his weakness, he stood and performed his salah. His weakness increased and, instead of feeling feverish, he started to feel cold and perspired. He could not perform Maghrib Salaah while standing. Thus, he sat and requested Moulvi Sayyid Ahmad to perform the salah quickly. His condition deteriorated and he performed Isha Salah while seated on his bed. He passed the night in restlessness while constantly performing dhikr. He did not sleep at all. On Tuesday morning, Khalil performed Fajr Salah while seated on his bed. His perspiration and coldness continued to increase. Medicine was administered for a day. At the time of Dhuhr Salaah, Khalil was overcome with weakness to such an extent that he was unable to perform wudu. Thus, he performed tayammum and then performed salaah while seated on the bed. Thereafter, movement became difficult. By the time of Asr Salaah, his condition had further deteriorated. He performed Asr Salaah with much difficulty. By Maghrib Salaah, he no longer had any strength to lift himself. Besides Pas Anfas, which is a method of dhikr by breathing, Khalil was not able to do anything else. He did not respond to any conversation nor did he ask any questions. Twenty-four hours passed in complete silence and on Thursday, 13 October 1927, Khalil died as he repeatedly proclaimed "Allah!" aloud. Then, his eyes closed and he became silent.

Funeral
Despite the small amount of time available, funeral arrangements were accomplished successfully. Sayyid Ahmad Tawwaab performed the ghusl while Abu Sa'ud poured the water. Moulvi Sayyid Ahmad and Moulvi Abdul Karim assisted. The Salat al-Janazah or his body was prepared for funeral, brought outside Al-Masjid an-Nabawi (mosque of the Prophet Muhammad, and placed near Babul Jibra'il for Salat al-Janazah. After Maghrib Salaah, Maulana Shaikh Tayyib, the rector of Madrasa Shari'a, led the Salat al-Janazah. The funeral procession then proceeded to Jannat al-Baghi cemetery. Khalil was buried in his grave shortly before Isha prayer.

Notes

References

bibliography 
 
 
 
 
 
 
 
 
 
"الشيخ خليل أحمد السَّهَارَنْفُوْرِي ومنهجه في كتابه "بذل المجهود في حلّ سنن أبي داود"

Indian Sunni Muslim scholars of Islam
Deobandis
Maturidis
19th-century Muslim theologians
Hadith scholars
Hanafi fiqh scholars
Indian Sufis
Sunni Sufis
Sunni imams
Sunni Muslim scholars of Islam
Chishti-Sabiris
Critics of Wahhabism
1852 births
1927 deaths
Mazahir Uloom alumni
Burials at Jannat al-Baqī
Critics of Shia Islam
20th-century Muslim theologians
People from Saharanpur district